Street Dogs of South Central is an 85-minute documentary film directed by Bill Marin and distributed by Lions Gate in association with Animal Planet.  Narrated by Queen Latifah, it is a nature documentary depicting the lives of stray dogs on the streets of South Central Los Angeles.

The story follows the life of Elsie—a black labrador mix—and her struggles in raising her pups on the streets of Los Angeles. The film is set to premiere on Animal Planet and OWN in 2012.

The film screened at the 2012 Atlanta Film Festival, the 2012 Vancouver International Film Festival, and the 2012 St. Louis International Film Festival.

The film was nominated for the Genesis Awards in the TV Documentary category.

References

External links 
 
 

Documentary films about Los Angeles
Documentary films about dogs
American documentary films
2012 documentary films
2012 television films
2012 films
Street dogs
South Los Angeles
2010s English-language films
2010s American films